Eyes of Laura Mars is a 1978 American neo noir mystery-thriller film starring Faye Dunaway and Tommy Lee Jones and directed by Irvin Kershner. The screenplay was adapted (in collaboration with David Zelag Goodman) from a spec script titled Eyes, written by John Carpenter; it was Carpenter's first major studio film. H. B. Gilmour later wrote a novelization.

Producer Jon Peters, who was dating Barbra Streisand at the time, bought the screenplay as a starring vehicle for her, but Streisand eventually decided not to take the role because of "the kinky nature of the story", as Peters later explained. As a result, the role went to Dunaway, who had just won an Oscar for her performance in Network. Streisand nevertheless felt that "Prisoner", the torch song from the film, would be a good power ballad vehicle for her. She sang it on the soundtrack and garnered a moderate hit as a result (the record peaked at number 21 on the Billboard Hot 100).

Eyes of Laura Mars is said to be an example of an American version of the Italian giallo genre. Peters commissioned photographer Helmut Newton to provide the images that stand in for Laura Mars' portfolio. The film is also noted for its use of red herrings and its twist ending.

Plot
Laura Mars is a glamorous fashion photographer who specializes in stylized violence. In the middle of controversy over whether her photographs glorify violence and are degrading to women, Laura begins seeing, in first person through the eyes of the killer, real-time visions of the murders of her friends and colleagues.

John Neville, the lieutenant in charge of the case, shows Laura unpublished police photographs of unsolved murders that very closely mirror Laura's fashion shoots. Laura's visions continue, including visions of the killer stalking her and continuing to murder those around her. Meanwhile, Laura and Neville fall in love. He gives her a gun as protection. Meanwhile, the police consider Laura's driver Tommy and ex-husband Michael to be their prime suspects. When they find photographs of murdered models in Tommy's apartment, the police try to arrest him but shoot him dead when he tries to escape.

At her apartment, Laura is affected by a vision of the killer murdering Michael. The killer attempts to break in through her front door, but Laura deadbolts it before the killer can enter. Upon hearing her distress, Neville (who had been on his way to meet her) breaks through her balcony window. He proceeds to tell Laura that Tommy was the killer and begins an elaborate explanation of his motivations and back story. Knowing Tommy well, Laura recognizes this as a lie. Neville, still talking about the killer, uses "I".  Laura realizes that Neville is the killer. Neville details more of his own story, slipping between multiple personalities. When the violent personality tries to kill Laura, his more sensitive personality reasserts dominance. He takes her hand, which holds the gun he gave her, and asks her to kill him. Distraught, she does so then calls the police.

Cast
 Faye Dunaway as Laura Mars
 Tommy Lee Jones as Lieutenant John Neville
 Brad Dourif as Tommy Ludlow
 René Auberjonois as Donald Phelps
 Raúl Juliá as Michael Reisler
 Frank Adonis as Detective Sal Volpe
 Lisa Taylor as Michelle
 Darlanne Fluegel as Lulu
 Rose Gregorio as Elaine Cassel
 Bill Boggs as himself
 Steve Marachuk as Robert
 Meg Mundy as Doris Spenser
 Marilyn Meyers as Sheila Weissman
 John Sahag as Hairdresser

Production
The film's source story was written by John Carpenter, as was the earliest version of the screenplay. Producer Jack H. Harris had worked with Carpenter on the latter's feature-film directorial debut, Dark Star, and it was Harris who optioned Carpenter's 11-page treatment, then titled simply Eyes.

Harris planned to make the film independently of the major studios with privately raised finance and Roberta Collins in the lead. But Harris's friend Jon Peters read the treatment, and upon reading it, he became enthusiastic about its potential as a vehicle for Peters's then-girlfriend Barbra Streisand. Peters got interest from Peter Guber at Columbia and they agreed to finance the project's development. Streisand pulled out of the film, but Columbia were sufficiently enthusiastic about the script to move forward with another actress, and Faye Dunaway was cast. However, as a condition of this, the studio insisted on the script being rewritten; David Zelag Goodman shouldered that burden.

"It wasn't a pleasant experience", said Carpenter. "The original script was very good, I thought. But it got shat upon."

Filming took place over 56 days from October 17, 1977 to early January 1978. The film was shot entirely in New York and New Jersey, with filming locations including New York City; Jersey City, New Jersey; and Ferncliff Cemetery in Hartsdale, New York.  A sequence where the Laura Mars character photographs a group of models against a backdrop of two burning cars was filmed over four days at New York's Columbus Circle. It was reported that Peters and Dunaway had a tense relationship while making the film.

Reception
On its release, the film received mixed critical reviews, but it was a box office hit, earning $20 million from a $7 million budget.

The movie received a broadly positive review in The New York Times, in which Janet Maslin called the ending of the film "dumb", but otherwise liked it. She wrote of it: "It's the cleverness of Eyes of Laura Mars that counts, cleverness that manifests itself in superlative casting, drily controlled direction from Irvin Kershner, and spectacular settings that turn New York into the kind of eerie, lavish dreamland that could exist only in the idle noodlings of the very, very hip."

Roger Ebert was less enthusiastic, giving the film one-and-a-half stars out of four and criticizing what he called the film's clichéd "woman in trouble" plot.

As of December 2022, the film has an approval rating of 55% on Rotten Tomatoes, based on 33 reviews, with an average rating of 5.5/10. The site's critics' consensus states: "Eyes of Laura Mars hints at interesting possibilities, but they're frittered away by a predictable story that settles for superficial thrills."

George Lucas hired director Kershner for The Empire Strikes Back because he was impressed after seeing a rough cut of the film.

A parody of the film titled Eyes of Lurid Mess was published in Mad Magazine. It was illustrated by Angelo Torres and written by Larry Siegel in regular issue #206, April 1979.

Soundtrack

Eyes of Laura Mars (Music from the Original Motion Picture Soundtrack) was released by Columbia Records (PS 35487) in July 1978. It was produced by Gary Klein with executive producers Jon Peters and Charles Koppelman.

Mark Iskowitz of The Barbra Streisand Music Guide wrote: "The side one 'Prisoner' track is actually identical to the single and Greatest Hits Volume 2 version. The side two reprise version does contain instrumentation from the film score at the beginning and during the first sections of the song, which is featured in its entirety. Track 3 opens with Barbra singing the first four lines from 'Prisoner' with a sparse, spooky film score backing."

The Eyes of Laura Mars LP is out of print; it was never released on CD.

Track listing

References

External links
 
 
 
 
 

1978 films
1970s mystery thriller films
1970s serial killer films
1970s supernatural films
American mystery thriller films
American neo-noir films
American serial killer films
American supernatural thriller films 
Columbia Pictures films
Films about fashion photographers
Films directed by Irvin Kershner
Films produced by Jon Peters
Films scored by Artie Kane
Films set in New York City
Films shot in New Jersey
Films shot in New York (state)
Films shot in New York City
Films with screenplays by John Carpenter
Giallo films
1970s English-language films
1970s American films
1970s Italian films